The Bakhtiari River is a river in Iran and a tributary of the Dez River in southwestern Iran. Before forming the Dez, the Bakhtiari has a confluence with the Sezar River.

References

Rivers of Lorestan Province